InterContinental Hanoi Landmark72 is an InterContinental hotel in Hanoi. The hotel is located on the top floors of Keangnam Hanoi Landmark Tower. At 346 meters, it is the tallest hotel in Hanoi, second tallest in Vietnam and Southeast Asia.

Location
InterContinental Hanoi Landmark72 is located in the center of the new West Hanoi business district, near the National Convention Center, Hanoi Museum and 45-minute drive away from the Noi Bai International Airport. Part of the Landmark72 complex, the hotel commences from the 62nd to the 71st floor of the tallest skyscraper in Hanoi, and second tallest in Vietnam.

Facilities
At 346 meters height, the hotel is listed at number 9 on World's 10 highest hotel with data from Emporis.

InterContinental Hanoi Landmark72 offers 359 guest rooms including 34 suites.

The hotel has one of the largest meeting and event facilities in Hanoi, with 9 meeting rooms and 1 Grand Ballroom that can cater up to 1,000 delegates.

The hotel features five restaurants and bars all located on the 62nd floor - The Hive Lounge (lobby lounge), 3 Spoons (all-day dining restaurant), Stellar Steakhouse, Stellar Teppanyaki and Q Bar (bespoke cocktail bar).

See also
 List of tallest hotels in the world
 List of tallest buildings in the world
 List of tallest residential buildings in the world
 Keangnam Hanoi Landmark Tower

References

Construction records
Hotels in Hanoi
InterContinental hotels
Skyscraper hotels
Skyscrapers in Hanoi
Hotel buildings completed in 2017
Hotels established in 2017
2017 establishments in Vietnam